Blastochloris  is a genus of bacteria from the order of Hyphomicrobiales.

References

 

Hyphomicrobiales
Bacteria genera